Phyllonorycter aarviki is a moth   of the family Gracillariidae. It is found in Tanzania and Yemen. The habitat consists of dry semi urbanized areas along the Indian coast and in eastern Africa.

The length of the forewings is 2.3 mm. The forewing ground colour is bright ochreous with blackish fuscous markings. The hindwings are pale grey with a long pale fuscous fringe of the same shading than the hindwing. Adults are on wing in late March (eastern Africa) and in early May (coast of the Arabian Peninsula).

Etymology
The species is named after Leif Aarvik, collector of the holotype and a lepidopterist at the Natural History Museum at the University of Oslo.

References

Moths described in 2012
aarviki
Moths of the Arabian Peninsula
Insects of Tanzania
Moths of Africa

Taxa named by Jurate de Prins